Katia is a 1938 French historical drama film starring Danielle Darrieux. The movie was directed by Maurice Tourneur, based on novel Princesse Mathe Bibesco by Marthe Bibesco under the pseudonym Lucile Decaux. It tells the love affair of Russian princess and Czar Alexander II.

It was remade in 1959 with the same title, which starred Romy Schneider.

Cast
Danielle Darrieux as Katia Dolgoroukov
John Loder as Le tsar Alexandre II
Marie-Hélène Dasté as La Tsarine
Aimé Clariond as Le Comte Schouwaloff
Thérèse Dorny as La baronne

Notes

External links

1938 films
French historical romance films
French black-and-white films
1930s historical romance films
1938 romantic drama films
Films set in Russia
Films set in the 1860s
Films set in the 1870s
Films set in the 1880s
French romantic drama films
1930s French-language films
1930s French films